Thadi railway station (station code: THY), located in the Indian state of Andhra Pradesh, serves Golagam and Thadi villages from Anakapalle mandal in Visakhapatnam district. It lies in Howrah–Chennai main line.

History 
Between 1893 and 1896,  of the East Coast State Railway was opened for traffic. In 1898–99, Bengal Nagpur Railway was linked to the lines in southern India.

Visakhapatnam Steel Plant was established in the 1980s and the first coke oven battery was commissioned in 1989.

Classification 
In terms of earnings and outward passengers handled, Thadi is categorized as a Non-Suburban Grade-6 (NSG-6) railway station. Based on the re–categorization of Indian Railway stations for the period of 2017–18 and 2022–23, an NSG–6 category station earns nearly  crore and handles close to  passengers.

See also 
List of railway stations in India

References 

Railway stations in Visakhapatnam
Railway stations in Waltair railway division
Year of establishment missing